John Dizikes (November 8, 1932 – December 26, 2018) was Professor of American Studies at the University of California, Santa Cruz. He served as Cowell College provost and was a recipient of the UCSC Alumni Association's Distinguished Teaching Award. Dizikes was a founding faculty member at UCSC, which he joined in 1965, just before the university opened to students, and taught for 35 years until his retirement in 2000.

Dizikes was the author of five books and numerous articles. His 1993 book Opera in America: A Cultural History won the 1993 National Book Critics Circle Award for Criticism. The book also won the 1993 Commonwealth Club of California's Gold Medal for Non-Fiction. The Washington Post called it "the first book of its kind" and "a tour de force" of history. Dizikes also wrote extensively about sports in American culture, had an interest in thoroughbred horse racing, and in 2000 published a biography of Hall of Fame jockey Tod Sloan. His most recent book, Love Songs: The Lives, Loves, and Poetry of Nine American Women, was published in early 2018.

An award bearing his name, the John Dizikes Teaching Award in Humanities, is presented each year to an instructor at UCSC, and includes an additional scholarship grant for undergraduate students who have studied with award recipients.

Books

References

External links
 Photographs of John Dizikes from the UC Santa Cruz Library's Digital Collections

1932 births
2018 deaths
20th-century American historians
American male non-fiction writers
University of California, Santa Cruz faculty
Harvard University alumni
20th-century American male writers